Ecnomiohyla echinata (common name: Oaxacan fringe-limbed treefrog) is a species of frog in the family Hylidae. It is endemic to Sierra Juárez, Oaxaca, Mexico. Its natural habitat is cloud forest at around  asl. It relies on humid habitats, in particular the vegetation along streams as well as epiphytic plants where it can find refuge. It breeds in streams. It is threatened by habitat loss and the spread of chytridiomycosis.

References

echinata
Endemic amphibians of Mexico
Fauna of the Sierra Madre de Oaxaca
Amphibians described in 1961
Taxonomy articles created by Polbot